Jamie Lee Wilson, also known as JVMIE, is an Australian singer, songwriter and music producer. She is best known for the 2017 single Back 2 Love in collaboration with Grammy Award-winning producer Dave Audé which peaked at No. 2 on the Billboard Club Dance Chart and No. 31 on the Billboard Hot Dance Electronic Songs Chart.

Early life and education 
Wilson was born and raised on the Gold Coast, Queensland in Australia. She earned a Bachelor of Music at the Queensland Conservatorium of Music with a major in Jazz Voice, and was featured by Triple J Unearthed in Australia.

Career 
After completing a Bachelor of Music at the Queensland Conservatorium of Music, Wilson relocated to London to continue her studies and went on to perform across the United Kingdom and Europe. She worked in Music Theatre. Simultaneously, Wilson began her career writing and recording music.

Wilson went on to perform nationally and internationally, writing and recording multiple top-charting dance singles, and in 2016, she relocated to Los Angeles.

Collaborations and solo records 
In 2016, Wilson collaborated with Grammy Award-winning producer Dave Audé on the single Back 2 Love which peaked at No. 2 on the Billboard Club Dance Chart and No. 31 on the Billboard Hot Dance Electronic Songs Chart. During the same year, Wilson was ranked No. 1 on the Los Angeles Dance Chart on ReverbNation.

She has collaborated with ASCAP Pop Award and two-time Grammy Award-nominated songwriter and producer Tommy Faragher, Grammy Award-nominated house musician Todd Terry, Grammy Award-nominated electronic music producers Sultan & Ned Shepard, Grammy Award-nominated DJ Joachim Garraud, Grammy Award-nominated producer and DJ Stonebridge, Grammy Award-winner musician Dave Audé, and American vocalist Chris Willis.

Her singles have consistently ranked on dance and club charts nationally and internationally. These include Out of Nowhere, a collaboration with StoneBridge, which ranked in the top 30 most played songs on US dance radio in 2015, Your Love with Kid Kenobi and Justin Hunter which ranked No. 3 on the ARIA Club Charts for six consecutive weeks, ranked No. 2 on the Kiss FM Charts, and was played on Rage and Channel V; Get What You Give with Alex Kenji and Manuel De La Mare (Spinnin' Records) which ranked No. 17 on the Progressive house chart on Beatport; Promise Me which ranked No. 1 on Track It Down for over four weeks and in the Top 10 on Beatport; Like A Flame which was released in July 2015 with Todd Terry and was featured on in House Sessions in Ibiza; Teardrop with Sydney Blu which ranked No. 13 on DMC World Magazine's Buzz Chart, ranked in Top 40 on ITunes Dance Charts, and was featured on the album Relentless which ranked in the top 20 on Beatport and in the top 40 on the ITunes Dance Charts; I Need A Miracle which ranked No. 4 on Juno Downloads; Can You Feel Me (Universal Music) which ranked No. 5 on the Australian radio charts and was featured on Pump It: Volume 4 compilation which ranked No. 3 on the ARIA Charts; I Think I'm in Love in collaboration with the Futuristic Polar Bears (Universal Music); Champagne Nights with the Stafford Brothers which was released on Ministry of Sound; Would Not Change a Thing with Soul Conspiracy which ranked No. 1 on Radio Metro; Black Rain, written with American house producer Ron Carroll, for which Wilson produced the Naked Remix which then debuted on Cr2 Records; Stop The World with Ralph Good (Warner Music and Kontor Records) which ranked No. 3 on the EDM charts in Canada, ranked on Beatport's Top 100 House charts, and featured on the Berlin Fashion Week official compilation, and the Kontor House of House compilation; Where You Are which was released on Japan's Sushi Records and ranked No. 3 on the Beatport Charts; and I'll Give You The World with Quix which ranked No. 21 in Spotify's New Music Friday Cratediggers playlist and was featured on Apple Music Germany Dance: The A-List, Apple Music Germany Dance: Hot Tracks, iTunes Canada Dance: The A-List, Beatport Trap/Future Bass: Staff Picks, and Aoki's House Radio Show on Sirius XM BPM.

Wilson released her first solo record Crazy Beautiful in 2015. She also hosted and produced her own radio show Just Wanna Dance during prime time on Saturday evenings in Australia, in addition to hosting fashion, music and television events.

In 2018, Wilson released the track Chasing, in collaboration with Shaun Warner, which ranked No. 32 on the Billboard Club Dance Chart.

Live performances and festivals 
Wilson has performed live at international music festivals, including Creamfields and Summerfieldayze. She has performed on the world's largest floating music festival The Groove Cruise in 2016 (San Diego / Cabo San Lucas) and (Miami / Jamaica) and 2015 (Los Angeles / Catalina Island), on the main stage at California's Sundown Music Festival on Huntington Beach.

She has supported Kelly Rowland, Salt-N-Pepa, Kaskade, and James Morrison, and performed at Pacha Ibiza supporting David Guetta, in Amsterdam supporting CeCe Peniston, in Japan supporting Steve Aoki, at Brixton Academy in London supporting Carl Cox, and at various venues in London supporting The Freemasons, Junior Jack, and The Shapeshifters. She has also performed at renowned Los Angeles clubs Sound and Avalon, as well as distinguished London venues Pacha and Turnmills.

She has performed live on Good Morning Australia, live on radio in Europe, New Zealand and Australia, and performed live multiple times in the United States, Russia, Switzerland, and Amsterdam, performed for Ministry of Sound Japan, Hed Kandi in New Zealand, and at venues in France, Singapore, and across her native country Australia, including performances for the Australian Prime Minister in Brisbane, Australia and the Russian Prime Minister in Sochi, Russia.

Use in media 
In 2011, Wilson co-wrote and recorded the new anthem Everybody (Hala Madrid) with the Stafford Brothers for the Real Madrid Football Club.

In 2017, her track Your Love with Kid Kenobi and Justin Hunter was featured on the Logie Award-winning Australian drama series Packed to the Rafters. Additional tracks were featured on international television channel FashionTV.

Discography

Awards and nominations 
In 2013, Wilson was nominated along with the Gowrie Boys for Film Clip of the Year at the National Indigenous Music Awards for Tomorrow's Heroes, and was a finalist in the International Songwriting Competition and the Queensland Music Awards.

In 2015, she was nominated for both Artist of the Year and the People's Choice Awards in the Gold Coast Music Awards.

In 2016, she was nominated along with the Gowrie Boys in the Queensland Music Awards for Won't Let You Go.

In 2020, JVMIE was awarded a mini grant from HOTA Rage Against The Virus Fund to create an album in isolation with film composer, Lionel Cohen while affected by the COVID-19 Pandemic

External links 
 JVMIE Official Website
 JVMIE on SoundCloud
 JVMIE on Spotify

References 

Living people
21st-century Australian women singers
Australian songwriters
Australian record producers
Queensland Conservatorium Griffith University alumni
Australian expatriates in the United States
Year of birth missing (living people)